Zagłoba - is a Polish coat of arms. It was used by several noble families in the times of the Polish–Lithuanian Commonwealth.

History

It originally comes from the city of Plock, Masovia in central Poland.
Bearers of this Coat of Arms took part in January Uprising and Polish-Soviet War.

Blazon

Notable bearers
Notable bearers of this coat of arms include:

Władysław Smoleński (1851–1926), professor of history at Warsaw University.

See also
 Polish heraldry
 Heraldry
 Coat of Arms

Polish coats of arms